George Cyril Allen (28 June 1900 – 31 July 1982), published as G. C. Allen, was a British economist and academic. He was Brunner Professor of Economic Science at the University of Liverpool from 1933 to 1947, and then Professor of Political Economy at University College London from 1947 to 1967. He wrote on Japanese and British industrial policy.

Life
Allen was born in Kenilworth, Warwickshire. After education at King Henry VIII School, Coventry he briefly joined at the Royal Air Force in 1918 before studying at the University of Birmingham. There he studied under William Ashley, graduating B.Com in 1921 and M.Com in 1922. From 1922 to 1925 he taught economics at the Higher Commercial School in Nagoya, Japan. Returning to Birmingham, Allen gained a PhD in 1928 with a thesis which was published the following year as The Industrial Development of Birmingham and the Black Country. He became professor of economics at the University College of Hull in 1929, and Brunner Professor of Economic Science at the University of Liverpool in 1933. In 1947 he became Professor of Political Economy at University College London.

His papers are held at University College London.

Works
 Modern Japan and its problems, 1927
 The industrial development of Birmingham and the Black Country, 1860-1927, 1929
 British industries and their organization, 1933
 Japan: the hungry guest, 1938
 Japanese industry: its recent development and present condition, 1939
 (with Elizabeth Boody Schumpeter) The industrialization of Japan and Manchuko, 1930-1940: population, raw materials and industry, 1940
 A short economic history of modern Japan, 1867-1937, 1946
 (with Audrey Donnithorne) Western enterprise in Far Eastern economic development: China and Japan, 1954 
 (with Audrey Donnithorne) Western enterprise in Indonesia and Malaya: a study in economic development, 1957 
 Japan's economic recovery, 1958
 A short economic history of modern Japan, 1958
 The structure of industry in Britain: a study in economic change, 1961
 Japan's economic expansion, 1965
 Monopoly and restrictive practices, 1968
 The British disease : a short essay on the nature and causes of the nation's lagging wealth, 1979
 The Japanese economy, 1981
 Appointment in Japan: memories of sixty years, 1983

References

External links
 Economists' Papers: Allen, George Cyril, 1900-82
 

1900 births
1982 deaths
English economists
Academics of the University of Liverpool
Academics of University College London
Fellows of the British Academy